Adiós pampa mía is a 1946 Argentine romantic drama film directed and written by Manuel Romero. The film starred Alberto Castillo and Francisco Charmiello.

Cast
Alberto Castillo
Francisco Charmiello
Víctor Ferrari
Herminia Franco
María Esther Gamas
Perla Mux
Mercedes Quintana
Alberto Vila

External links
 

1946 films
1940s Spanish-language films
Argentine black-and-white films
Tango films
Films directed by Manuel Romero
1946 romantic drama films
Argentine romantic drama films
1940s Argentine films